Peter or Pete Francis may refer to:

Peter Francis (buccaneer), mid-17th century French pirate (real name Pierre Francois, often Anglicized as Peter Francis)
Peter Francis (runner) (born 1936), Kenyan Olympic athlete
Peter Francis (volcanologist) (1944–1999), British volcanologist
Peter Francis (footballer) (born 1958), former Australian rules footballer
Peter Francis (priest) (born 1953), former Provost of St Mary's Cathedral, Glasgow
Pete Francis Heimbold (born 1981),  Pete Francis, former guitarist and vocalist for the American jam band Dispatch
Peter D. Francis (born 1934), American politician in the state of Washington
Peter Francis (judge), British barrister and judge

See also